Tore Storehaug  (born 18 February 1992) is a Norwegian politician. 
He was elected representative to the Storting for the period 2017–2021 for the Christian Democratic Party. He is a member of the Standing Committee on Energy and the Environment.

References

1992 births
Living people
Christian Democratic Party (Norway) politicians
Members of the Storting
Sogn og Fjordane politicians